Mohammad Fazlul Karim (born 30 September 1943) is a Bangladeshi jurist who served as the 18th Chief Justice of Bangladesh.

Early life 
Karim was born on 30th September 1943 in Chittagong, East Bengal, British India. Karim graduated from the University of Dhaka with a law degree.

Career
From 1965 to 1992, Karim was a lawyer of the Supreme Court of Bangladesh.

On 15 June 2001, Karim was made a Judge on the Appellate Division of Bangladesh Supreme Court. 

Karim was the Chief Justice from 8 February 2010 to 30 September 2010 as the 18th chief justice of Bangladesh. His predecessors M. M. Ruhul Amin and Md. Tafazzul Islam became Chief Justices superseding him. In April 2010, he refused to administer the oath of office to two nominees, Md. Khasruzzaman and Md. Ruhul Quddus, to the High Court Division. Khasruzzaman was accused of vandalizing the courts during protest and Quddus was accused of murder. Karim sentenced Editor of Amar Desh, Mahmudur Rahman and it's reporter, Oliullah Noman, to six months and one month imprisonment respectively on contempt of court charges.

References

Living people
1943 births
People from Chittagong District
Supreme Court of Bangladesh justices
Chief justices of Bangladesh